John S. Durland was a member of the Wisconsin State Assembly.

Biography
Durland was born on December 1, 1847 in Chester, Orange County, New York. He finished his education in Bloomfield, New Jersey before moving to Rushford, Minnesota in 1869 and La Crosse, Wisconsin in 1888.

Career
Durland was a Republican member of the Assembly during the 1905 session. He was also a member of the city councils and boards of education of Rushford and La Crosse.

References

People from Chester, Orange County, New York
People from Bloomfield, New Jersey
People from Rushford, Minnesota
Politicians from La Crosse, Wisconsin
Republican Party members of the Wisconsin State Assembly
Wisconsin city council members
Minnesota city council members
School board members in Wisconsin
School board members in Minnesota
Minnesota Republicans
1847 births
Year of death missing